Fatal dog attacks in the United States cause the deaths of about 30-50 people in the US each year, and the number of deaths from dog attacks appears to be increasing. Around 4.5 million Americans are bitten by dogs every year, resulting in the hospitalization of 6,000 to 13,000 people each year in the United States (2005). A 2018 literature review with meta-analysis by breed, focusing on dog bite injuries to the face, head and neck, concluded that "of the cases in which the breed was known, the Pit bull was responsible for the highest percentage of reported bites across all the studies followed by mixed breed and then German Shepherds," and that "injuries from Pit bulls and mixed breed dogs were both more frequent and more severe."

Injuries, illnesses, and fatalities resulting from encounters with dogs are a major public health concern worldwide. Dogs not only cause morbidity and mortality as a result of bites, but they may also transmit zoonotic infections, which may also result in illness or death. Dogs are the main source of rabies transmission to humans worldwide. It is estimated that 3% to 18% of dog bite wounds become infected, with occasional cases of meningitis, endocarditis, and septic shock leading to death reported. Children have the greatest risk of death.

Below are lists of fatal dog attacks in the United States reported by the news media, published in scholarly papers, or mentioned through other sources. In the lists below, the breed is assigned by the sources.

Fatalities in 2020

Fatalities in 2021

Fatalities in 2022

Fatalities in 2023

See also 
 Animal attack
 Beware of the dog
 Breed-specific legislation
 Coyote attack
 Dingo attack
 Dogs in the United States
 List of wolf attacks
 Wolf attack

Species:
 List of fatal alligator attacks in the United States
 List of fatal bear attacks in North America
 List of fatal cougar attacks in North America
 List of fatal snake bites in the United States
 List of fatal shark attacks in the United States

References 

United States
Lists of deaths due to animal attacks in the United States
Dogs in the United States